Steve Leslie Mahon (born 22 January 1965) is a former Grenadian cricketer who represented the Windward Islands in West Indian domestic cricket. He played as a right-handed middle-order batsman.

Mahon made his first-class debut for the Windwards in January 1986, in a Shell Shield game against Barbados. He made semi-regular appearances for the team into the following decade, in both first-class and one-day competitions, but never established himself in the side for an extended period. In total, Mahon played seventeen first-class and nine List A matches for the Windwards between 1986 and 1993. He never passed fifty in either format, with his highest first-class score being 45 (made against Yorkshire in March 1987) and his highest one-day score being 38 (made against Jamaica in February 1988).

References

External links
Player profile and statistics at CricketArchive
Player profile and statistics at ESPNcricinfo

1965 births
Living people
Grenadian cricketers
Windward Islands cricketers